Weiz may refer to:

 Weiz, a small town of 9.445 inhabitants in the eastern part of Styria, Austria
 SC Weiz, an Austrian association football club founded in 1924
 Weiz District (a district of the state of Styria in Austria
 Puch bei Weiz, a municipality in the Weiz District in Styria, Austria
 Kulm bei Weiz, a municipality in the Weiz District in Styria, Austria
 Gschaid bei Weiz, Naas, in the Weiz District in Styria, Austria
 WEIZAC (Weizmann Automatic Computer), the first computer in Israel

See also 
 Weiz (surname)